The 2017 UNAF U-18 Tournament was the 10th edition of the UNAF U-20 Tournament which was apparently changed from U-20 to U-18. The tournament took place in Tunisia, from 26 April to 2 May 2017. Tunisia won the tournament.

Participants

 (hosts)

Tournament

Matches

Winners

References

External links
 2017 UNAF U-18 Tournament champion - Official website

2017 in African football
UNAF U-20 Tournament
UNAF U-18 Tournament